Demo 2004 is the demo album by French post-metal band Year of No Light, released in 2004. It was originally released on a limited edition CDR (150 copies) on Radar Swarm. Most of the songs were later re-recorded for the band's first album, Nord.

Track listing 
All tracks written by Year of No Light.
 "Thanatos" – 4:18
 "L'Angoisse Du Veilleur De Nuit D'Autoroute Les Soirs D'Alarme À Accident" – 2:44
 "Le Rire Mauvais Des Enfants Sages" – 1:06
 "Tu As Fait De Moi Un Homme Meilleur" – 4:16
 "Ils Avaient Des Visages D'Anges Et Des Fusils Automatiques" – 3:32
 "Ils Te Feront Payer Tes Crimes En Monnaie De Cauchemar" – 1:08
 "Par Économie Pendant La Crise On Éteint La Lumière Au Bout Du Tunnel" – 4:55
 "Qu'Importe Qu'Ils Me Haïssent, Pourvu Qu'Ils Me Craignent" – 6:59

Personnel

Band members
 Bertrand Sébenne – drums
 Jérôme Alban – guitar
 Pierre Anouilh – guitar
 Julien Perez – vocals, keyboards
 Johan Sébenne – bass

Other personnel
 Julien Perez – recording
 Greg Vezon – album art and design

References

Year of No Light albums
2004 EPs
Demo albums